Sericosema immaculata is a moth in the family Geometridae described by William Barnes and James Halliday McDunnough in 1913. It is found in North America.

The MONA or Hodges number for Sericosema immaculata is 6673.

References

Further reading
 
Scoble, Malcolm J., ed. (1999). Geometrid Moths of the World: A Catalogue (Lepidoptera, Geometridae), 1016.

External links
Butterflies and Moths of North America

Geometridae
Moths described in 1913